Gerhard Fritsch (28 March 1924 – 22 March 1969) was an Austrian novelist and poet. He won great success for his first novel Moos auf den Steinen (Moss on the Stones). This was later adapted into a film. Fritsch's second novel, 'Fasching' (Carnival) was published in 1969, the year in which Fritsch committed suicide.

References

Further Reading
 Augustinus P. Dierick: “Politics, the Elegiac, and the Carnivalesque: Gerhard Fritsch’s Moos auf den Steinen and Fasching.” Seminar, 38:1 (February 2002).

1924 births
1969 deaths
20th-century Austrian novelists
20th-century Austrian poets
Austrian male poets
German-language poets
Austrian male novelists
20th-century Austrian male writers
Austrian military personnel of World War II
Luftwaffe personnel of World War II
German prisoners of war in World War II held by the Soviet Union
Deaths by hanging
Deaths from asphyxiation